The Clementon School District is a community public school district that serves students in pre-kindergarten through eighth grade from Clementon, in Camden County, New Jersey, United States.

As of the 2021–22 school year, the district, comprised of one school, had an enrollment of 553 students and 54.1 classroom teachers (on an FTE basis), for a student–teacher ratio of 10.2:1.

The district is classified by the New Jersey Department of Education as being in District Factor Group "B", the second-lowest of eight groupings. District Factor Groups organize districts statewide to allow comparison by common socioeconomic characteristics of the local districts. From lowest socioeconomic status to highest, the categories are A, B, CD, DE, FG, GH, I and J.

Public school students in ninth through twelfth grades attend Overbrook High School in Pine Hill as part of a sending/receiving relationship with the Pine Hill Schools. The high school also serves the community of Berlin Township as part of a sending/receiving relationship. As of the 2021–22 school year, the high school had an enrollment of 733 students and 61.6 classroom teachers (on an FTE basis), for a student–teacher ratio of 11.9:1.

School
Clementon Elementary School had an enrollment of 550 students in grades PreK-8 as of the 2021–22 school year. Members of the school's administration are:
Jared Fudurich, Principal

Administration
Core members of the district's administration include:
Kathleen Haines, Superintendent
Bruno Berenato, Business Administrator / Board Secretary

Board of education
The district's board of education, comprised of nine members, sets policy and oversees the fiscal and educational operation of the district through its administration. As a Type II school district, the board's trustees are elected directly by voters to serve three-year terms of office on a staggered basis, with three seats up for election each year held (since 2012) as part of the November general election. The board appoints a superintendent to oversee the district's day-to-day operations and a business administrator to supervise the business functions of the district.

References

External links
Clementon School District

School Data for the Clementon School District, National Center for Education Statistics

Clementon, New Jersey
New Jersey District Factor Group B
School districts in Camden County, New Jersey